Trichopus is a genus of two known species of flowering plants. These plants were formerly included in the family Trichopodaceae, but are now considered to belong to Dioscoreaceae.

Taxonomy
The known species of Trichopus are T. sempervirens, endemic to Madagascar and T. zeylanicus, native to India, Sri Lanka, Thailand and Malaysia.

References

Dioscoreales genera
Dioscoreaceae